Bowhouse railway station served the suburb of Bowhouse, Falkirk, Scotland, from the 1840s to 1964 on the Slamannan Railway.

History 
The station was opened in the 1840s by the Slamannan Railway. It has three sidings a loading bank and a goods yard with a goods shed, although it wasn't served by rail. The signal box opened in 1892 but it was downgraded to a ground frame in 1892. The station closed to passengers on 1 May 1930 and closed to goods on 6 July 1964.

References

External links 

Disused railway stations in Falkirk (council area)
Railway stations in Great Britain closed in 1930
1964 disestablishments in Scotland